Buchanan are an alternative rock band formed in late 2009. The band is the project of English-born Josh Simons in collaboration with friends. Buchanan announced their retirement in January 2019 on their tenth anniversary. Simons currently resides in Los Angeles where he is working on new material while also serving as CEO for music social-professional network Vampr.

History

2009–2012: Early years and No Photo - EP

Originating out of Melbourne, Australia, the band recorded their debut record The Safety Beach E.P. in April 2010. Featuring production by Tim Cross (former Mike Oldfield collaborator) the collection of demos was released on iTunes in May 2010. The band were shortly after invited to showcase for several record labels. Deciding to steel themselves and avoid hasty commitment, the band headed back to the studio to develop more material and record the follow-up.

Triple J debuted "Mr Keeperman" on Australian national radio on 19 September 2010. The band would go on to be featured on the Triple J Unearthed page and podcast.

In November 2010, the band released a single called "Teachers" independently via TuneCore. The single was a Triple J hit, immediately added to high rotation and gained a five out of five star rating from Richard Kingsmill and multiple additions to The Hype Machine.

In early 2011, the band played their first full electric shows in Sydney and Melbourne, playing to sold-out venues with the likes of Gypsy and the Cat, Kimbra, Georgia Fair and Alpine. In February 2011 the band won the Triple J Unearthed competition and were invited to play the esteemed Laneway festival in Melbourne, playing alongside Foals, Two Door Cinema Club, Cut Copy and Gotye.

On 29 April 2011, the band released their first mass-produced record, No Photo - EP, to a strong critical reception. Distributed via Inertia Records, Zoo Weekly gave the release four stars, comparing the songs to "Phoenix, with the emotional gravitas of Mumford & Sons and the instrumental dexterity of Sigur Rós." MX newspaper gave the release three and a half stars describing the music as "considered indie pop." The band held residency throughout the month of release at Northcote Social Club as well as supporting Tim & Jean to promote the release.

In June 2011, Buchanan embarked on their first national tour in support of second single "Mr Keeperman", playing shows in Adelaide, Sydney and Melbourne including supports with Jinja Safari, Trial Kennedy and Papa Vs Pretty. To promote the tour, the band appeared live on Triple J, Sea FM, Star FM, Joy FM, Channel 31 and on BalconyTV to perform acoustically. On 23 August 2011 the band's single "Mr Keeperman" debuted at number six on the Australian AMRAP community radio charts after being released to air as a single.

2012–2014: Human Spring

In March 2012, the band released "Run Faster", a warm-up single for their forthcoming debut album, to positive critical reviews. In May 2012, the song was added to rotation on Austereo's Radar Radio. In July 2012, Buchanan won Austereo's Radar Unsigned Find competition, marking the band as the first to be recognised nationally in unsigned competitions from both Triple J and Austereo. In August 2012, the song was added to high rotation on Triple J. The song spent nine consecutive weeks in the AIR Charts, reaching number 3 on the 100% Independent Radio Charts and number 12 on the Independent Label Radio Charts. The song was the 99th most played song on Triple J in 2012.

In October 2012, the band announced on their social media pages that they were embarking on a national tour of Australia throughout November and December. To coincide with the tour, the band offered a free download of a new B-side from their forthcoming debut album. The track, "When the Sun Comes Round Again", was made available for free from the band's official site.

In April 2013, the band announced their debut studio album, Human Spring, would go on sale in Australia and New Zealand on 10 May 2013. The album, released under Simons' own label Raw Imagination People Expect, was met with extremely positive critical reviews. Tone Deaf gave the album 9/10 calling it a "tremendous debut" while Zoo Weekly gave the album an 8/10. The album was produced by Catherine Marks with additional production by frequent collaborator Tim Cross. It was recorded at various studios in Australia and the UK over the past 18 months. Andy Baldwin was hired to mix the record with the band choosing to master the album at Abbey Road with Geoff Pesche. The band released the title track, "Human Spring", on 12 April as the second single off the album. Triple J added the single to high rotation immediately. The song reached number 10 on the AIR 100% Independent Radio Charts where it spent three weeks.

In June 2013, the band performed live on Triple J for Like a Version, performing a cover of Frank Ocean's "Thinkin Bout You". In July, the band released a new single from the album, "Par Avion", to coincide with a national headline tour of Australia. The band was also announced as part of the BIGSOUND Festival lineup for September 2013. The music video for "Par Avion" premiered on Yahoo! Music following the band's set at BIGSOUND.

In August 2013, both the band's single and album of the same name, "Human Spring", debuted at number 10 on the FMQB Sub-modern radio charts in North America, peaking at number 8. In April 2014 the band announced the release of the album worldwide, putting out a single from the album every three weeks in the lead up to its release. "Temperamentally" hit number 30 on the iTunes US Alternative charts following the release of the single's lyric video online. The album was made available for purchase worldwide on 9 July 2014.

2014–2016: Pressure in an Empty Space

The band relocated to London to commence work on their second studio album with renowned producer Simon Duffy. They released a video on social media for a new single called "Coming Down" on 21 July 2014. The track received firm radio and club support throughout the UK and Ibiza, debuting at No. 29 on the Music Week Commercial Pop Charts. The song was also nominated as a semi-finalist in the 2014 International Songwriting Competition.

On 26 September 2015 the band headlined the TEDx Macquarie University conference, which was streamed live worldwide, debuting several tracks from the new album. On 27 October, Simons' birthday, the band put up a post on social media revealing the album would be called Pressure in an Empty Space.

On 16 November 2015 the band released an EP, Living a Lie, which served as a precursor to the then upcoming second studio album. A national tour of Australia in support of the release was also announced for February 2016. Apple Music promoted several promotional videos from the EP on the homepage of its service worldwide.

Following the tour, the band released two consequential singles from the album, title track "Pressure in an Empty Space" and "Learn to Love Again", hinting at an April release date during an appearance on SYN FM. The release date was later confirmed to be 29 April. The title track was later shortlisted in the Vanda & Young Global Songwriting Competition.

On the week of the album release FasterLouder premiered a videoclip for the song "Stop!" The album debuted at 42 on the iTunes Australia charts and has taken the band past the million units streamed worldwide milestone. The album was mastered at Metropolis Studios in West London by John Davis and was met with extremely positive critical reviews. The album follows Simons during the compounding experiences of the breakdown of a committed relationship whilst dealing with an obscure form of cancer in 2014, which Tone Deaf described as "a stunning and incredibly moving piece of work."

The band premiered the video for the title track "Pressure in an Empty Space" on a new social-professional network for musicians called Vampr. Simons developed the app in collaboration with Hunters & Collectors' guitarist Barry Palmer, and was released in May 2016.

In July 2016 the band were announced as the opening act for Keith Urban, hand-picked for the Australian leg of his ripCORD World Tour along with Carrie Underwood. It was announced in the same month that Simons co-wrote The Voice (Australian TV series) winner Alfie Arcuri's single "Careless Game" with Troye Sivan. The release spent 3 weeks on the ARIA Charts, peaking at number 5.

On 28 October 2016 the band released their first live album, Alive, exclusively on Apple Music. The album includes 13 tracks recorded during their Living a Lie tour.

2016–present: The Crayon Collection, Collaborations and Vampr

Simons has been working on new material in Los Angeles at GOOD Music with producer Anthony Kilhoffer. The first track from these sessions, "The Beep Test", was released as a single on 25 November 2016. The music video for the single, filmed during the ripCORD World Tour, premiered on theMusic.com.au on 8 February 2017.

Simons and Kilhoffer co-wrote and co-produced the final track of Cyhi the Prynce's debut album No Dope on Sundays released in November 2017. The track "I'm Fine" features Travis Scott and the project was executive produced by Kanye West. The album debuted at 65 on the Billboard 200. It peaked at number 30 on Billboard charts' Top R&B/Hip-Hop Albums and reached number 1 on iTunes in the US for Hip-Hop/Rap.

In December 2017 Simons' app, Vampr, was featured by Apple in their "Best of 2017" roundup.

In January 2018 Simons co-produced and mixed Tre Capital single "Blue Eyes White Dragon Flow", which premiered on Complex. The track was the lead single for Tre Capital's third studio album, Hero, released 29 June 2018, where Simons served as executive producer and co-produced nine tracks.

In May 2018 Allan Kingdom's single "All Night" premiered on Hypebeast which Simons co-wrote with Kilhoffer. The release served as the lead single for his Peanut Butter Prince album released on 15 June 2018 where Simons co-wrote the tracks "Don't Wait", "Fall For You" and "All Night".

In June 2018 Simons contributed a vocal and piano performance for "Stand By You", a charity single by EveryOneBand. The project is the biggest band and largest interactive recording project in history, raising funds for Australian charity Support Act. The single debuted at number 1 on the AIR Singles Chart.

September 2018 saw the release of Songs From the Ashes, Pt. 2, an EP from singer-songwriter Cobi whose opening track "Church of the Lonely" was co-written by Simons. In October 2018 King IV released her single "Basic" which was produced and co-written by Simons.

Buchanan would release their first single in two years on 23 November 2018. Titled "Breathe" the song features guest vocal performances by Tre Capital and Georgia Mae. In press surrounding the release Simons indicated he's "starting to think about an album".

On 11 January 2019 the band announced their retirement with a final mixtape called The Crayon Collection to be released on 25 January 2019. The release included recently completed songs from each era and production team of the band's ten-year history. The announcement was accompanied by lead single "An Uncommon Experience" and a retrospective video chronicling the band's career highlights. The mixtape debuted at 79 on the iTunes Australia charts with over half a million streams as of the week of release.

The March 2019 release of Jenny Queen's album Baby It Was Real and We Were the Best on ABC Music included the single "Medicine" co-written by Simons.

Simons wrote the film score for the July 2019 documentary Latter Day Jew starring Judy Gold and which was accepted into 8 film festivals.

In April 2020 Simons was named in The Music Network's Thirty Under 30 Awards in addition to being voted Reader's Choice in a public poll. Simons was quoted acknowledging the awards by saying, "I’m going to celebrate with a quarantini," in reference to the curfews and lockdowns related to the 2019–20 coronavirus pandemic.

In 2021 Vampr was nominated for a Music Week award in the Music Consumer Innovation category, and would be nominated a second time in 2022, alongside Apple Music, TikTok and Amazon Music. In March 2022, Fast Company inducted Vampr into their Most Innovative Companies list. Later that year Google Play would spotlight the company in their Top 150 apps in the United States.

Discography

Studio albums
Human Spring (2013)
Act Natural
Par Avion
The Punch
Temptation
For Tonight We Rest (Leaves)
Run Faster
Human Spring
Temperamentally
Sit It Out
The Few
An All Clear?
Pressure in an Empty Space (2016)
Only Us
Learn to Love Again
Coming Down
Stop!
Pressure in an Empty Space
I Don't Want to Die
All That Remains
Pleasure
Uncuff Me

Mixtapes
The Crayon Collection (2019)
Breathe
Hold Off
An Uncommon Experience
The Beep Test

Live albums
Alive (2016)
Only Us (Live)
Learn to Love Again (Live)
Run Faster (Live)
Temperamentally/Teachers (Live)
Mr Keeperman (Live)
Aisles (Live)
Safety Beach (Live)
When the Sun Comes Round Again (Live)
Pressure in an Empty Space (Live)
Human Spring (Live)
Living a Lie (Live)
All That Remains (Live)
Coming Down (Live)

EPs
The Safety Beach E.P. (2010)
Mr Keeperman
Waiting
Safety Beach
Son
No Photo - EP (2011)
Moon
Mr Keeperman
Waiting
Teachers
Aisles
Waiting on a Sound (Bonus Track)
Living a Lie (2015)
Living a Lie
Galileo
Coming Down (Acoustic)

Singles

Awards and nominations

|-
| 2011
| "Teachers"
| Triple J Unearthed Competition
| 
|-
| 2012
| "Run Faster"
| Austereo's Radar Unsigned Find Competition
| 
|-
| 2014
| "Coming Down"
| International Songwriting Competition
| 
|-
| 2016
| "Pressure in an Empty Space"
| Vanda & Young Global Songwriting Competition
| 
|-

References

External links 
 Official website
 Buchanan at J Play

Australian indie rock groups
Musical groups established in 2009
Victoria (Australia) musical groups